Grănicești is a commune located in Suceava County, Bukovina, northeastern Romania. It is composed of six villages: namely Dumbrava (formerly Găureni), Grănicești, Gura Solcii, Iacobești, Românești, and Slobozia Sucevei. From 1776 to 1941, Iacobești village was inhabited by the Székelys of Bukovina.

References 

Communes in Suceava County
Localities in Southern Bukovina